Yên Định is a rural district of Thanh Hóa province in the North Central Coast region of Vietnam. As of 2003 the district had a population of 172,527. The district covers an area of 216 km². The district capital lies at Quán Lào.

References

Districts of Thanh Hóa province